Sidney Rosenthal (1907–1979), from Richmond Hill, New York, is credited with inventing what is now known as a Magic Marker in 1953.

References

1907 births
1979 deaths
20th-century American engineers
20th-century American inventors
People from Richmond Hill, Queens